The Collaborative Inter-Governmental Scientific Research Institute (CISRI) is an international organization based in Italy and established by the Free Agreement for co-operation in scientific research and humanitarian use of micro-alga (sic) spirulina as food.

Constitution and legal status

CISRI was established by the Free Agreement for co-operation in scientific research and humanitarian use of micro-alga spirulina as food, a multilateral treaty. Parties to the agreement are the Democratic Republic of the Congo and Guinea with subsequent accessions by Equatorial Guinea and São Tomé and Príncipe. Although Italy's ratification was recorded as well, Italy declared in 2009 to the United Nations, that it "respectfully requests to be erased from the Annexes to Documents which have Registration Numbers 37543 and 37542"

According to the Agreement, the organization has 3 organs:
 General Council
 Secretariat
 Intergovernmental Institution for the Use of Micro-alga Spirulina (Spirulina Program) as affiliated body

CISRI focusses on international cooperation with relevant United Nations General Assembly’ s Resolutions on international cooperation, social development as well as food and water improvement.

Activities

CISRI focus on development activities started with the microalgae Spirulina, which has been indicated as a nutricious food source.

References

External links
Official site

Intergovernmental organizations
Intergovernmental organizations established by treaty
Malnutrition organizations